Interstate 29 (I-29) in the US state of North Dakota runs from the state's southern border with South Dakota near Hankinson to the Canadian border just north of Pembina. The highway runs concurrently twice with U.S. Highway 81 (US 81). The first such overlap begins in Watertown, South Dakota, across the state line to Manvel. The other is from exit 203 to the Canadian border. The highway runs somewhat parallel to the Minnesota border to the east and passes through two major cities, Fargo and Grand Forks.

Route description

South Dakota to Fargo

The first exit in the state, exit 1, is to a county road built along the state line. This exit serves the Dakota Magic Casino and Hotel. Rural exits are somewhat common in North Dakota. There are exits with no major communities near them about every  from the South Dakota state linee to Fargo. There is also one exit serving North Dakota Highway 11 (ND 11) to Hankinson and one exit serving ND 13 to Wahpeton.

Fargo to Grand Forks

There is also an exit that serves Hector International Airport. Farther north, there is an exit that indirectly serves Fargo via County Road 22 (CR 22) that mainly serves Harwood.

I-29 has one exit south of the city serving its municipal airport and one exit serving the city itself. There are three more exits between Hillsboro and Grand Forks, including one serving Thompson, the southernmost suburb of Grand Forks.

Grand Forks to Canada
One of them serves US 2, which leads to Grand Forks International Airport.

There are a couple more minor exits between the Oslo exit and Drayton. The highway has two exits in Drayton, one with ND 44 and one with ND 66.

After several more exits in the open country serving minor county highways, I-29 begins another concurrency with US 81 at an exit with ND 5. After one more exit serving a county road, the highways enter Pembina. In Pembina, I-29 has its final exit in the United States at an interchange with ND 59 and CR 55.  north of Pembina, I-29/US 81 enters Manitoba, Canada, and becomes Provincial Trunk Highway 75 (PTH 75), which leads north to Winnipeg.

History
I-29 between Fargo and the Canadian border was originally meant to be signed as Interstate 31 (I-31). There was no highway originally planned between Fargo and Sioux Falls, South Dakota. Plans for I-29 were extended from Sioux Falls to Fargo in October 1957, and the entire highway from Kansas City, Missouri, to the Canadian border was signed as I-29. The final stages of I-29 in North Dakota were completed in 1977.

Exit list

See also
 
Manitoba Highway 29

References

External links

29
 North Dakota
Transportation in Richland County, North Dakota
Transportation in Cass County, North Dakota
Transportation in Traill County, North Dakota
Transportation in Grand Forks County, North Dakota
Transportation in Walsh County, North Dakota
Transportation in Pembina County, North Dakota